Kermia producta is a species of sea snail, a marine gastropod mollusk in the family Raphitomidae.

Description
The length of the shell varies between 4 mm and 17 mm.

(Original description) The fusiformly elongate shell is longitudinally ribbed and finely striated transversely. The whorls are convex. The suture is impressed. The aperture is oval. The outer lip is denticulated. The siphonal canal is short. The colour of the shell is yellowish-brown. A darker band of the same colour appears  on each whorl.

Distribution
This marine species occurs off Fiji, French Polynesia, Hawaii; also off South Africa

References

 Kilburn, R. N. (2009). Genus Kermia (Mollusca: Gastropoda: Conoidea: Conidae: Raphitominae) in South African Waters, with Observations on the Identities of Related Extralimital Species. African Invertebrates. 50(2): 217–236.
 Severns, M. (2011). Shells of the Hawaiian Islands - The Sea Shells. Conchbooks, Hackenheim. 564 pp.

External links
 MNHN, Paris: specimen
 Moretzsohn, Fabio, and E. Alison Kay. "HAWAIIAN MARINE MOLLUSCS." (1995)
 Tröndlé, J. E. A. N., and Michel Boutet. "Inventory of marine molluscs of French Polynesia." Atoll Research Bulletin (2009)
 
 Gastropods.com: Kermia producta

producta
Gastropods described in 1860